Geranylgeranyl pyrophosphate is an intermediate in the biosynthesis of diterpenes and diterpenoids. It is also the precursor to carotenoids, gibberellins, tocopherols, and chlorophylls.

It is also a precursor to geranylgeranylated proteins, which is its primary use in human cells.

It is formed from farnesyl pyrophosphate by the addition of an isoprene unit from isopentenyl pyrophosphate.

In Drosophila, geranylgeranyl pyrophosphate is synthesised by HMG-CoA encoded by the Columbus gene. Geranylgeranyl pyrophosphate is utilised as a chemoattractant for migrating germ cells that have traversed the midgut epithelia. The attractant signal is produced at the gonadal precursors, directing the germ cells to these sites, where they will differentiate into eggs and spermatozoa (sperm).

Related compounds
 Farnesyl pyrophosphate
 Geranylgeraniol
 Geranyl pyrophosphate

References

Organophosphates
Diterpenes